Samuel Joseph Szmodics (born 24 September 1995) is a professional footballer who plays as an attacking midfielder for EFL Championship club Blackburn Rovers.

Szmodics started his career with hometown club Colchester United, where from the age of seven he progressed through the club's Academy. He made his professional debut for the club in September 2013 and scored 38 goals in 162 appearances for the club. While with Colchester, he appeared on loan for Braintree Town in 2015. In June 2019, Szmodics left Colchester to join Bristol City.

He joined Peterborough in September 2020, after a successful six-month loan spell at the end of the previous season.

Born in England, Szmodics received a call up to the Republic of Ireland squad for friendlies against Andorra and Hungary in May 2021.

Career

Colchester United
Born in Colchester, Szmodics is a product of the Colchester United Academy, having progressed through the club's youth ranks since the age of seven. He was a regular starter and scorer for the under-18 side, which included a goal in Colchester's 3–2 FA Youth Cup defeat by Chelsea on 1 December 2012, sweeping in Macauley Bonne's cross.

2013–14 season
For Colchester United's 2013–14 pre-season campaign, Szmodics was drafted in to the first-team for their friendly fixtures. He was included in manager Joe Dunne's squad for a game at AFC Sudbury on 12 July 2013, and scored twice in two first-half minutes to hand Colchester a 2–0 lead in their eventual 5–0 win. Szmodics was then drafted into the first-team squad during the season while the club were suffering an injury crisis. He came on as a substitute for Craig Eastmond to make his professional debut on 28 September as Colchester drew 1–1 with Bristol City at Ashton Gate.

While appearing in the first-team, Szmodics continued to play for the under-18s. He helped his side to a FA Youth Cup first round 4–1 win over AFC Wimbledon on 12 November by scoring the opening goal, which also helped to extend their unbeaten run to 13 wins from 13 league and cup games.

Szmodics was shortlisted for the Football League Apprentice of the Year award in the League One category in January 2014, facing opposition from Preston North End's Josh Brownhill and Milton Keynes Dons' Brendan Galloway. He finished as runner-up to Galloway in the awards held in March 2014.

With the Colchester United under-18 side, Szmodics helped to earn the club a league title and cup winning double during the 2013–14 season. He scored a hat-trick in the Youth Alliance Cup final held against Bradford City at Valley Parade on 29 April in a 4–2 win for the U's.

Szmodics ended the campaign with seven League One substitute appearances and one FA Cup substitute appearances to his name.

2014–15 season
Szmodics made his first appearance of the season as a second-half substitute for Freddie Sears in Colchester's 4–0 away defeat to Charlton Athletic in the League Cup on 12 August 2014. He then made his first professional start for the club on 30 August, when the U's were defeated 3–1 by Peterborough United at the Colchester Community Stadium. Szmodics was replaced by Dominic Vose after 57 minutes.

Szmodics signed a three-and-a-half year contract extension with Colchester on 10 October to see him through to the summer of 2018. He then scored his first professional goal for the club on 9 November. After coming on as an 81st-minute substitute for Alex Gilbey in the U's FA Cup first round tie against Gosport Borough, Szmodics lifted the ball over the Gosport goalkeeper in stoppage time, scoring Colchester's sixth goal in a 6–3 win. He scored his first league goal on Boxing Day 2014 in Colchester's 2–1 home defeat by Gillingham, turning in Sean Clohessy's pass. Having been confined mostly to substitute appearances, manager Humes said that Szmodics had been "very close" to being a regular starter for the club over the Christmas period, and that the player was "very much in our thoughts, going forward". Szmodics then broke into the first-team with a string of starts, beginning with a goalless draw with Crawley Town on 28 December.

After breaking into the first-team and making 35 appearances across the season, as well as scoring five goals, Szmodics was named as Colchester United 'Young Player of the Year' in May 2015.

2015–16 season and Braintree Town loan
After making six appearances in the first team in the early stages of the 2015–16 season, Szmodics was allowed to leave the club on loan in order to gain more first-team experience. He joined National League side Braintree Town on 30 October 2015 for an initial month-long loan. He made a goalscoring debut the following day as his 75th-minute goal earned Braintree a 1–0 win against Macclesfield Town at Cressing Road. Szmodics was recalled by his parent club on 27 November following manager Tony Humes' dismissal by Colchester on 26 November.

A foot injury kept Szmodics out of action for several months, wearing a protective boot and requiring injections in order to avoid an operation across Christmas and the New Year. He was ruled out for the rest of the season in March 2016 after undergoing surgery on his ankle. He had made eight appearances for Colchester in addition to his three for Braintree. Szmodics signed a three-year contract extension with the club on 21 June.

2016–17 season
Szmodics scored his first goal of the 2016–17 season on 27 August 2016 in Colchester's 2–0 win at Adams Park against Wycombe Wanderers. His ankle injury resurfaced during the latter stages of 2016, and in January 2017 he was forced to undergo surgery on his troublesome ankle which physio Tony Flynn estimated would keep Szmodics out of action for approximately six weeks. He returned to action on 4 March 2017, replacing Sean Murray during Colchester's game against Cambridge United. Within eight minutes of being introduced, Szmodics scored an equaliser for Colchester to earn a 1–1 draw. Following a challenge on Crewe Alexandra striker Chris Dagnall during Colchester's 2–0 away defeat on 18 March, it was confirmed that Szmodics had broken his leg and would be ruled out for the remainder of the campaign, having scored five goals in 23 games for Colchester.

2017–18 season
Szmodics came off the bench to score his first goal of the season and Colchester's only goal on 5 August in their season-opening 3–1 defeat at Accrington Stanley. After scoring five goals in five games throughout December, including a brace in a 3–1 win against Exeter City, Szmodics was nominated for the EFL League Two Player of the Month award. His performances during the first half of the season led to speculation that he was to sign for Premier League side A.F.C. Bournemouth for a £1 million fee during the January transfer window. He was subsequently named League Two Player of the Month on 12 January.

2018–19 season
Szmodics was again Colchester's top scorer for the second successive season with 15 goals, and with his contract set to expire at the end of the season, he was once again linked with a move away from the club.

Bristol City
On 28 June 2019, Szmodics ended his 16-year association with Colchester United, signing for Championship club Bristol City for an undisclosed fee on a three-year contract.

2019–20 season and Peterborough United loan
After making just four appearances in five months at Bristol City he signed for Peterborough United on a six-month loan deal on 16 January 2020.

Szmodics played his first game for Peterborough two days later, in a 1–0 defeat at AFC Wimbledon and went on to make a total of 10 appearances during his loan spell, scoring four goals – including a brace against Ipswich Town in a 4–1 win over their promotion rivals.

Peterborough United

On 8 September 2020, Szmodics signed permanently for Peterborough. He signed a four-year contract after signing for an "undisclosed fee" believed to be in excess of £1m, with a number of other clubs rumoured to be interested, including Sunderland and Portsmouth. Szmodics scored 16 goals in all competitions for Peterborough in the 2020–21 season, helping the club win promotion back to the Championship.

Blackburn Rovers
On 1 August 2022, Szmodics joined Blackburn Rovers on a three-year deal with an optional extra year, for an undisclosed fee. Peterborough had earlier rejected three bids from Blackburn, all in excess of £1m, before a fee was agreed. Blackburn manager Jon Dahl Tomasson said that Szmodics would be well-suited to the club's intense style of play. On 6 August 2022, Szmodics scored on his debut for Blackburn in a 3–0 away win against Swansea City.

International career
As well as his country of birth England, Szmodics is also eligible to represent Republic of Ireland and Hungary through his County Longford Irish-born grandmother and Hungarian-born grandfather. On 28 May 2021, Szmodics received his first call up to the Republic of Ireland senior squad for the summer friendlies against Andorra and Hungary (the country of his ancestors), following the withdrawal of Callum Robinson and Aaron Connolly from the initial squad through injury. On 2 June 2021, he was ruled out of the Republic of Ireland squad after he aggravated an existing shoulder problem in training ahead of the Andorra game.

Career statistics

Honours
Colchester United U18
2013–14 Football League Youth Alliance South East winner
2013–14 Football League Youth Alliance Cup winner

Individual
2015 Colchester United Young Player of the Year

References

External links

1995 births
Living people
Sportspeople from Colchester
Footballers from Essex
English footballers
Association football midfielders
Colchester United F.C. players
Braintree Town F.C. players
Bristol City F.C. players
Peterborough United F.C. players
Blackburn Rovers F.C. players
English Football League players
National League (English football) players
English people of Hungarian descent
English people of Irish descent